Martin Boďa (born 29 November 1995) is a Slovak professional footballer who plays for MFK Karviná as a midfielder.

Club career
Mikuš made his professional Czech Fortuna Liga debut for MFK Karviná against FC Baník Ostrava on 23 August 2020.

References

External links
 MFK Karviná official club profile 
 Futbalnet profile 
 
 

1995 births
Living people
Slovak footballers
Association football midfielders
FC ŠTK 1914 Šamorín players
FK Slovan Duslo Šaľa players
AFC Nové Mesto nad Váhom players
FK Dubnica players
FC Vysočina Jihlava players
MFK Karviná players
Czech First League players
Expatriate footballers in the Czech Republic
Sportspeople from Dunajská Streda